Amitermes is a genus of termites in the family Termitidae. It is the second largest genus after Microcerotermes in the subfamily Amitermitinae with around one hundred species. Species are found in a range of habitats including deserts and rainforests. Characteristics of Amitermes soldiers include a bulbous head, sickle-shaped mandibles with a single tooth on their inner margins and cephalic glands on the front of their heads.

Species
About one hundred species including the following species listed by the Encyclopedia of Life:

Amitermes beaumonti Banks, 1918
Amitermes coachellae Light, 1930
Amitermes conformis
Amitermes cryptodon Light, 1930
Amitermes darwini
Amitermes dentatus
Amitermes emersoni Light, 1930
Amitermes ensifer Light, 1930
Amitermes eucalypti
Amitermes evuncifer
Amitermes floridensis Scheffrahn, Su and Mangold, 1989
Amitermes germanus
Amitermes hastatus
Amitermes heterognathus
Amitermes laurensis
Amitermes lonnbergianus
Amitermes meridionalis
Amitermes minimus Light, 1932
Amitermes obeuntis
Amitermes pallidus Light, 1932
Amitermes parvulus Light, 1932
Amitermes parvus
Amitermes silvestrianus Light, 1930
Amitermes snyderi Light, 1930
Amitermes vitiosus
Amitermes wheeleri (Desneux, 1906)

References

Termite genera